Eric Oswald Stork (January 8, 1927 - February 2, 2014) was an American regulator from the Environmental Protection Agency. He tangled with the auto industry over automobile air pollution standards.

Biography 

Eric Oswald Stork was born on January 8, 1927, in Hamburg, Germany.  He was sent to Britain as a child, came to the United States at 13, and grew up in the state of Washington.  He served in the U.S. Army near the end of World War II. After serving in the army, he studied at the University of Washington for two years before transferring to Reed College, where he earned a BA in political science, writing his thesis on the Pacific Northwest Field Committee of the Department of the Interior. After Reed, he earned an MS in public administration from the Maxwell School of Citizenship and Public Affairs in Syracuse, New York, then entered the federal government through an elite junior management assistant program. One year later in Washington, D.C., Eric met Dorothy Sams; they were married in 1953 and raised three children.

References

External links 
 

1927 births
2014 deaths
People of the United States Environmental Protection Agency
University of Washington alumni
Reed College alumni
Maxwell School of Citizenship and Public Affairs alumni
German emigrants to the United States